ESRA, as an initialism, stands for:
European Safety and Reliability Association
European Survey Research Association, founded in 2005 to provide coordination in the field of Survey Research in Europe
École Supérieure de Réalisation Audiovisuelle, a French educational academy
Entertainment Software Rating Association, Iranian video game rating body

See also
 Ezra (disambiguation)
 Esra